Carex backii, commonly known as Back's sedge, is a species of sedge (Carex) in the section Phyllostachyae. First described scientifically in 1839 by American botanist Francis Boott, it is found in Canada and the United States, where it grows in shaded woods, shaded slopes, and shrub thickets.

Description
The inflorescence is typically a single terminal spike lacking a spike bract.

References

backii
Flora of Western Canada
Flora of Eastern Canada
Flora of the Northwestern United States
Flora of the North-Central United States
Flora of the Northeastern United States
Plants described in 1839
Flora without expected TNC conservation status